The Trunk Space is an all-ages music venue in Phoenix, Arizona, United States. It is located at 1124 N 3rd Street.

Background
Originally a coffee cart called The Paper Cup in the now defunct Paper Heart Gallery, in its original location on Van Buren Rd., co-owners JRC and Stephanie Carrico split from the Paper Heart Gallery to form The Trunk Space. The Trunk Space is an art gallery, coffee bar, and performance space. There are gallery shows twice a month, for Phoenix's First Friday and Third Friday art walks, with randomly occurring private events. The coffee bar features a full-service espresso machine which uses Xanadu coffee beans. The performance space is used for improv comedy, MST3K-styled movie showings and most notably, musical performances. Performers vary in genre, amounts of experimentation and experience levels.

Presently, the featured mural on the brick wall which hosts the front entrance of The Trunk Space was painted by Luster Kaboom.

Music
The Trunk Space is a notable venue for touring acts that are on the rise. Some notable acts that have come through include; Matt and Kim, Nobunny, Japanther, Mark Sultan (of The King Khan and BBQ Show fame), Julian Koster, Kimya Dawson, Quintron and Lightning Bolt.
Some notable acts have gotten their starts and have come to prominence through frequent playing at the venue, including opening for some of the bigger, touring acts.

Andrew Jackson Jihad, Michelle Blades, and TreasurE MammaL are a few notable bands that fall under that category.

Performance Art
On top of monthly Improv and a Late-Night Talk Show, there are performance arts pieces of varying types, such as roasts of those living and deceased.

Community
Through its years of being open, The Trunk Space has a developed a very close and personal group of volunteers and regulars, whom consider the venue and its involved members to be family. These regulars can be found helping run the door, running the espresso machine, setting up bands and running the sound board. Sean Bonnette of Andrew Jackson Jihad got a tattoo of The Trunk Space's street numbers, backwards, after noting them from frequently while performing on the stage, where the street numbers can be seen reversed above the door facing Grand Avenue. Since he has gotten the tattoo, numerous other family members have received the tattoo, including Carrico and JRC. At last count, at least a dozen presently have the tattoo.

In April 2014, the community celebrated The Trunk Space's 10th anniversary with a multiple-day concert festival, Indie 500, which featured dozens of bands, performing over the course of 10 days, with some 500 songs played in total.

See also
First Friday Art Walk

References

External links
The Trunk Space official site

Music venues completed in 2004
Art museums and galleries in Arizona
Music venues in Arizona
Music of Phoenix, Arizona